Larry Robert Lawrence (born April 11, 1949 in Mount Pleasant, Iowa) is a former professional American football quarterback. Lawrence attended Thomas Jefferson High School in Cedar Rapids, Iowa and played football in college for the Miami Hurricanes and Iowa Hawkeyes. Undrafted coming out of college, he started his pro career in the CFL for two seasons, then signed with the Oakland Raiders as a free agent. He played for two years as a backup, starting two games and missing most of the 1975 season with an injury. The Buccaneers traded for him during the 1976 preseason. Coach John McKay praised his accuracy in the preseason, but he was unable to make an impact in limited playing time during the regular season, and was waived when Pittsburgh Steelers backup quarterback Terry Hanratty became available. Lawrence died on December 4, 2012.

References

External links
CFL career stats

Miami Hurricanes football players
Iowa Hawkeyes football players
People from Mount Pleasant, Iowa
Players of American football from Iowa
Oakland Raiders players
Tampa Bay Buccaneers players
1949 births
2012 deaths
American football quarterbacks
Canadian football quarterbacks
Calgary Stampeders players
Edmonton Elks players
Montreal Alouettes players